The Celtic longboat is a rowing boat used for coastal and ocean rowing, racing, training and recreation. It has four sweep-oared rowers and a cox.

Racing this type of boat has a long history on the West Wales coast. 

Dale Sailing from Neyland was selected as the builder in 1999 and to date over 22 boats have been built (4 of which have gone to Dubai) with another 12 on order. 

The Welsh Sea Rowing Association is the body that governs racing and oversees Celtic Longboat racing events. There are several Celtic Longboat Clubs throughout Wales.

References

External links
Celtic Longboat History
https://web.archive.org/web/20110312120708/http://www.dale-sailing.co.uk/clb.html manufacturer of Celtic Longboats

Rowing racing boats
Welsh culture